Vanessa Brigitte Gilles (born March 11, 1996) is a Canadian professional soccer player who plays as a centre-back for French club Lyon (on loan from Angel City FC) and the Canada national team.

Early career 
Originally a tennis player, in her teenage years, Gilles quit the sport to switch to soccer. After briefly attempting to play as a goalkeeper, she became a defender. She played for FC Capital United in Ottawa, Ontario, winning a league title in 2013. At the 2013 Canada Summer Games, she won a bronze medal with Team Ontario.

College career 
She then played for the Cincinnati Bearcats in the United States from 2014 to 2017. She was named 2015 American Athletic Conference Most Outstanding Defensive Player of the Tournament and, in 2016, became the first Bearcats women's athlete to earn all-conference first team accolades in both the preseason and postseason in American Athletic Conference history. In 2017, she was named American Athletic Conference Co-Defensive Player of the Year. When she won an Olympic gold medal in 2021, she became the fifth athlete in Bearcats history to do so.

Club career

West Ottawa SC 
In May 2017, Gilles joined League1 Ontario side West Ottawa SC. She scored 2 goals in 9 appearances in the regular season, and was selected to the 2017 League1 Ontario All-Star third team. She was also selected to represent League1 Ontario in the All-Star game against the Team Ontario squad competing in the 2017 Canada Games.

Apollon Limassol 
In January 2018, Gilles signed a short-term contract with Cypriot First Division side Apollon Limassol. She made her professional debut for the club on January 14, starting in a 1–1 draw with Anorthosis Famagusta. She scored 10 goals in 11 appearances for the club in the regular season, and made 3 appearances in the Cypriot Women's Cup tournament, helping Apollon Limassol win the final against Pyrgos Limassol on penalties.

Bordeaux 
In July 2018, Gilles signed a two-year contract with Division 1 Féminine side Girondins de Bordeaux. In May 2020, she signed a two-year extension with Bordeaux.

Angel City FC 
After 3.5 years at Bordeaux, Gilles would transfer to NWSL club Angel City FC for an undisclosed fee. She would sign a contract for 2022 with an option for 2023.

Lyon (loan) 
In September 2022, Gilles signed for Lyon on a season-long loan.

International career 
Although born in Quebec, Gilles was eligible to play for France as her father was born in Paris. In November 2018, Gilles was called into the France U23 camp, and played for Les Bleues in a 5–2 victory against Belgium.

Canada 
On January 18, 2019, she made her unofficial debut for Canada in a behind-closed-doors friendly against Switzerland. On November 10, she made her official debut in a 3–0 victory against New Zealand at the 2019 Yongchuan International Tournament.

She was named to the Canadian national team for the 2020 Summer Olympics. She scored the decisive penalty shootout goal for Canada in the quarterfinals against Brazil. Although her penalty shootout attempt in the final of the tournament against Sweden hit the crossbar, Canada won the game and she would earn her first Olympic gold medal.

Personal life 
On March 20, 2019, Gilles spoke at the United Nations in New York City, as part of the 63rd Session of the Commission on the Status of Women.

For the first twelve years of her life, her family lived in Shanghai, before returning to Canada to live in Ottawa. She graduated high school from École secondaire publique Louis-Riel and then graduated with a bachelor's degree from the University of Cincinnati with a major in criminal justice and a minor in IT.

Career statistics

Club 
.

Honours 
Apollon Limassol
 Cypriot Women's Cup: 2018
Canada
 Summer Olympics: 2021
Individual
 CONCACAF W Championship Best XI: 2022

References

External links 
 Vanessa Gilles at University of Cincinnati
 
 Vanessa Gilles at Cyprus Football Association

1996 births
Living people
Canadian women's soccer players
Expatriate women's footballers in France
Women's association football defenders
People from Châteauguay
Soccer people from Quebec
Cincinnati Bearcats women's soccer players
Division 1 Féminine players
FC Girondins de Bordeaux (women) players
Canadian people of French descent
Footballers at the 2020 Summer Olympics
Olympic soccer players of Canada
Olympic medalists in football
Medalists at the 2020 Summer Olympics
Olympic gold medalists for Canada
Franco-Ontarian people
Canadian expatriate sportspeople in France
Expatriate women's soccer players in the United States
Canadian expatriate sportspeople in the United States
Expatriate women's footballers in Cyprus
Canadian expatriate sportspeople in Cyprus
Angel City FC players
West Ottawa SC players
National Women's Soccer League players
Canada women's international soccer players
French women's footballers
France women's youth international footballers